"His & Hers" is a single by American record collective Internet Money, featuring American rappers Don Toliver, Lil Uzi Vert, and Gunna. It was released on May 13, 2021, and was produced by Internet Money members Taz Taylor, Nick Mira, Alec Wigdahl, Pharaoh Vice, and Cxdy,.

Background
In an interview, Taz Taylor told Zane Lowe that he started working on the song after the release of another song he produced, "Lemonade" by Internet Money, featuring Gunna, Toliver, and Canadian rapper Nav. Taylor was inspired to make another hit song, adding:

So at that point, I was like, "All right, well they want me to go make the biggest records. They want me to go get the biggest artists on the songs. That's what they want." So I was just searching for the biggest songs that I heard. And then "His & Hers", I heard a demo with a different guitar and it was way slow. It was like 127 BPM. And I was just like, "This is it. I got to do it." So August 15th was the first day of this song. I started working on it and I just finished it.

Composition
The song, described as melodic, sees the rappers singing about their wealth, drugs and guns and "harmonizing about their rockstar lifestyles", over an instrumental of acoustic guitars and "booming" percussion. The chorus finds Don Toliver "crooning" about "rocking matching designer items with his girlfriend."

Critical reception
Joshua Robinson of HotNewHipHop wrote that "Don's earworm of a hook is easily the most recognizable early highlight". Tara C. Mahadevan of Complex called Toliver's chorus "soulful". Elliot Santiago of Hypebeast wrote that Gunna and Lil Uzi Vert "elevate the track with a verse a piece", and the instruments in the beat "anchor the new tune, making for a breezy and soulful beat to add to your playlist." Chris DeVille of Stereogum compared "His & Hers" to the aforementioned song "Lemonade", writing that it is similar to the latter in which it "boasts chilled-out yet sweltering minor-key production that seems precision engineered for playlist placement". He added that Lil Uzi Vert's replacement for Nav "should theoretically be an upgrade."

Music video
A music video for the song was directed by Cole Bennett and released on May 14, 2021. It shows Don Toliver, Lil Uzi Vert and Gunna inside a Windows XP computer screen, where they make their way through a misty forest, dressed in camouflage. Toliver performs his verse on a "grassy hilltop under a partially cloudy blue sky" and "frolics among a field of sunflowers" during the chorus. Gunna's performance setting is in a cubical room with a pattern also with hills in the sky on the walls and ceiling. Uzi appears on the surface of the moon.

Credits and personnel
Credits adapted from Tidal.

 Internet Money 
 Taz Taylor – production, songwriting
 Nick Mira – production, songwriting
 Alec Wigdahl – production, songwriting
 Pharaoh Vice – production, songwriting
 Cxdy – production, songwriting
 Don Toliver – lead vocals, songwriting
 Lil Uzi Vert – lead vocals, songwriting
 Gunna – featured vocals, songwriting
 Cole Bennett – songwriting
 Mike Dean – songwriting
 Beam – songwriting
 Donny Flores – songwriting
 Giorgio Ligeon – songwriting
 Edgard Herrera – songwriting, mixing, engineering, studio personnel
 Juan Botero – songwriting
 Maxwell Nichols – songwriting
 Simon Plummer – songwriting
 Chris Galland – mixing, studio personnel
 Manny Marroquin – mixing, studio personnel
 Francisco Salcido – mixing, studio personnel
 Anthony Vilchis – assistant mixing, studio personnel
 Jeremie Inhaber – assistant mixing, studio personnel
 Zach Pereyra – assistant mixing, studio personnel
 Michelle Mancini – mastering, studio personnel

Charts

Certifications

References

2021 singles
2021 songs
Don Toliver songs
Internet Money songs
Gunna (rapper) songs
Lil Uzi Vert songs
Music videos directed by Cole Bennett
Song recordings produced by Taz Taylor (record producer)
Songs written by Don Toliver
Songs written by Gunna (rapper)
Songs written by Lil Uzi Vert
Songs written by Mike Dean (record producer)
Songs written by Nick Mira
Songs written by Taz Taylor (record producer)